The SEAlang Library is an online library that hosts Southeast Asian linguistic reference materials.

Established in 2005 and publicly launched on April 1, 2006, it was initially funded from the Technological Innovation and Cooperation for Foreign Information Access (TICFIA) program of the U.S. Department of Education, with matching funds from computational linguistics research centers. In 2009, it focused on the non-Roman script languages used throughout mainland Southeast Asia. Beginning in 2010 and continuing through 2013, concentration moved to the many languages of maritime Southeast Asia.  Resources include bilingual and monolingual dictionaries; monolingual works and aligned bitext works; tools for manipulating, searching, and displaying complex scripts; and specialized reference works that include historical and etymological dictionaries.

References

External links
SEAlang home page
Mahidol University linguistics theses

Austroasiatic
Mon–Khmer Languages Project
Munda Languages Project
Dictionary of Old Khmer
La Vaughn Hayes Vietic digital archives
Frank Huffman Katuic audio archives
Frank Huffman papers
Harry Shorto papers

Austronesian
R. David Zorc papers (Philippine languages)
Zoetmulder's Dictionary of Old Javanese
Old Javanese inscriptions
NUSA - Linguistic Studies of Indonesian and Other Languages in Indonesia
Loan-Words in Indonesian and Malay (Compiled by the Indonesian etymological project; Russell Jones, General Editor)

Sino-Tibetan
Gordon Luce papers
Northeast Indian Linguistics Society archives
Tai and Tibeto-Burman Languages of Assam
Chamchang (Kimsing) online dictionary
Cholim (Tonglum) online dictionary
Joglei (Yugli) online dictionary
Mueshaungx (Mossang) online dictionary
Singpho dictionary

Others
Ahom online dictionary

Digital libraries
Southeast Asian studies
Languages of Southeast Asia